5 Aurigae is a triple star system in the northern constellation of Auriga, located about 195 light years away from the Sun based on parallax. It is just visible to the naked eye as a dim, yellow-white hued star with an apparent visual magnitude of 5.95. The system is moving away from the Earth with a heliocentric radial velocity of +6 km/s, having come within  some 8.7 million years ago.

This was initially discovered to be a binary star system by Otto Struve. The outer pair has an orbital period of 1,598 years with an eccentricity of 0.536. It has a stellar classification of F5 V, matching an F-type main-sequence star.

References

External links
 HR 1599
 CCDM J05003+3924
 Image 5 Aurigae

F-type main-sequence stars
Triple stars
Auriga (constellation)
Durchmusterung objects
Aurigae, 05
031761
023261
1599